The 1984 Winter Olympics, officially known as the XIV Olympic Winter Games, was a winter multi-sport event held in Sarajevo, Yugoslavia, from 8 to 19 February 1984. A total of 1,272 athletes representing 49 National Olympic Committees (NOCs) participated in 39 events from 10 different sports and disciplines. First time NOCs to enter were Egypt, Monaco, Puerto Rico, Senegal, and British Virgin Islands.

Seventeen NOCs won at least one medal and, among these, eleven secured at least one gold medal. For the first time since its debut at the 1968 Winter Olympics, East Germany topped the gold medal count with nine, three more than the Soviet Union, which had led this count in the past three Games. The Soviet delegation won the most overall medals (25), including the most silvers (10) and bronzes (9). The host nation, Yugoslavia, collected its first-ever medal at the Winter Olympics: a silver by alpine skier Jure Franko in the men's giant slalom. This was the third time that the Winter Olympics host team failed to win a gold medal, after France in 1924 and Switzerland in 1928.

Austrian athletes secured a single medal—a bronze in men's alpine skiing downhill—in what is the nation's worst ever result at the Winter Games.
In contrast, Czechoslovakia and Finland's performances in Sarajevo were historical bests, after collecting a total of six and thirteen medals, respectively.
Finnish cross-country skier Marja-Liisa Hämäläinen was responsible for three of her NOC's four gold medals with a sweep of victories in the women's individual events, and contributed to the bronze in the team relay event.
These Games also witnessed the best result by a Canadian team since the 1960 Winter Olympics, thanks mostly to the achievements of speed skater Gaétan Boucher. His wins in the men's 1,000 and 1,500 metres, and a third place in the 500 metres, earned Canada's two gold medals and three of its four medals.
Sweden secured four golds for the first time since St. Moritz 1948, of which three were obtained by cross-country skiers Gunde Svan and Thomas Wassberg. Svan and Wassberg won the men's 15 km and 50 km, respectively, and also clinched the first place in the team relay. Svan was also awarded with a silver and bronze medals, thus contributing half of his NOC's medal tally.
For the third consecutive Winter Olympics, Great Britain's sole medal was a gold at a figure skating event, this time in ice dancing by Jayne Torvill and Christopher Dean, who received the first-ever set of perfect scores in their free program routine.

Medal table 

The medal table is based on information provided by the International Olympic Committee (IOC) and is consistent with IOC convention in its published medal tables. By default, the table is ordered by the number of gold medals the athletes from a nation have won, where nation is an entity represented by a National Olympic Committee (NOC). The number of silver medals is taken into consideration next and then the number of bronze medals. If nations are still tied, equal ranking is given and they are listed alphabetically.

Medal distribution

See also 
 1984 Winter Paralympics medal table
 1984 Summer Olympics medal table

References

External links 
 
 
 
 

Medal table
1984